Marisa Isabel dos Santos Matias (Coimbra, 20 February 1976) is a Portuguese sociologist and Member of the European Parliament, elected for the first time in 2009 and re-elected in 2014. She currently sits on the Economic and Monetary Affairs (ECON) and Industry, Research and Energy (ITRE) Committees. She is also Chairwoman of the Delegation of the European Parliament for relations with the Mashreq countries (Egypt, Jordan, Lebanon and Syria). Between 2010 and 2016 she was Vice-President of the Party of the European Left.

In November 2015, Matias announced her candidacy for the 2016 Portuguese presidential elections, representing the Left Bloc party. She finished 3rd, with 10,12% of the votes, the best result ever achieved by a woman in a presidential election in Portugal at the time. She was also a candidate for Left Bloc in the 2021 Portuguese presidential election in which she came 5th, with 3.95% of the vote.

Biography 

Marisa Matias studied Sociology at the University of Coimbra, where she completed her doctoral thesis: “Is nature sick of us? Health, environment and emerging forms of citizenship” (2009). Her areas of specialisation include environmental health, sociology of science, political sociology, democracy and participation. She has published several scientific articles, chapters in books and other publications, on the relations between environment and public health, science and knowledge, democracy and citizenship.

Civic and political activity 
Matias is a member of the Left Bloc National Board and Executive Board; as well as a member of the board of Pro-Urbe, a civic association in Coimbra. She was a national trustee of the movement "Cidadania e Responsabilidade pelo Sim", during the campaign for decriminalization of abortion in Portugal. She was also an activist in the movement against co-incineration in Souselas (pt) and head of the Left Bloc list in the elections for Coimbra Municipality (2005).

Member of the European Parliament

2009 – 2014 
In 2009, Matias was elected as a Member of the European Parliament (MEP) for the Left Bloc, which sits as part of the political group GUE/NGL in the European Parliament. She was made a member of the Industry, Research and Energy Committee and the Environment, Public Health and Food Safety Committee and a member of the delegations for relations with the Mashriq Countries, with Palestine, and with South Africa.

At the beginning of her mandate, Matias was nominated the Parliament's rapporteur to write and negotiate the directive preventing the distribution of counterfeit medicines, a business that generates more than €400 billion per year for the counterfeiting networks and puts at risk the life of patients. The directive, negotiated for almost two years with the parliamentary groups and the governments, was approved in 2011. This was only the second time since Portugal's entrance into the EU that a Portuguese MEP had led the process of a framework-directive - a law that will be transposed to the judicial system of each of the EU Member States.

At the same time, she was also rapporteur of the European strategy in the fight against Alzheimer and other dementias, that was also approved in 2011. She was co-president of the European Work Group for Diabetes, being co-author of the first resolution to ever be approved in the European Parliament aiming at the definition of a political strategy to fight the diabetes epidemic (2010). In addition, she was involved in the planning and approval of resolutions on cancer and HIV, and was an active member of the parliamentary committee of inquiry on the H1N1 vaccine. In 2011, Matias was chosen by her peers, with more than 350 votes, as MEP of the Year for health - the only MEP from the United Left Parliamentary Group to receive this honour since its creation.

Throughout 2011 and 2012, Matias was the Parliament's rapporteur for the definition of a Common Strategic Framework for Research and Innovation. The report was approved in 2012 and established the bases for what should be the proposal for the Horizon 2020 programme on the European financing of research and innovation for the period 2014–2020. Besides the proposal to reinforce the funds and of a better geographical distribution of the funds, the approved proposal also included a significant increase of support to the scientific work and to the attribution of scholarships within the European financing framework. Later, would also be part of the team of six rapporteurs, nominated by the European Parliament, to the definition and negotiation of the proposal about the Horizon 2020, being responsible for one of the legislative regulations on the Strategic Agenda for Innovation. The legislative package would end up being approved at the end of 2013, being already active since January 2014.

In 2012, she was still nominated rapporteur of the European Parliament for the evaluation of the European Central Bank (ECB) activities of 2011, the year the ECB presidency changed. In a very disputed process and hard negotiations, her report would be approved by one vote of difference in the Economic and Monetary Affairs Committee. Later, the report would be approved, in plenary, still in 2013, but Marisa Matias requested her name to be withdraw as a result of approved changes in the final vote. Those changed took out of the report all the critical references to the ECB as member of the European Troika, equally eliminating the proposal to oblige the ECB to restore to the countries under the Troika's intervention the profits resulting from the complex processes of buying and selling of public debt titles.

Marisa Matias was, still, the Parliament's rapporteur for four opinion on European strategy for adapting to climate change, resettling of GDP calculation, proposal for a new pluri-annual financing framework and regulation defining indexes on the goods traded in stock market.

As shadow rapporteur, meaning, MEP responsible within its parliamentary group, to follow and negotiate proposals led by other colleagues from other parliamentary groups, Marisa Matias followed, during the mandate, the making of 25 parliamentary proposals, having presented proposals for change and being present in negotiation meetings. So far, was also co-author of 119 proposals of parliamentary resolutions.

While Vice-President of the Parliament to the relations with the Mashreq countries (Lebanon, Syria, Jordan and Egypt) was part and presided to several parliamentary negotiations with these countries, coordinating processes of negotiation with the correspondent national parliaments. This was also done during the period known for the transformations introduced by the Arab Spring. Marisa is also member of the Parliament's Delegation to the relations with the Palestinian Legislative Council, having developed initiatives mainly concerning the siege of the Gaza Strip.

Presidential candidacy 
On 18 October 2015, Catarina Martins, coordinator of the Left Bloc, announced that, as no credible unifying leftist candidate had thus far come forward for the Presidential elections of January 2016, Marisa Matias allowed her name to be put forward as representing her party in those elections. She finished 3rd, with 10,12% of the votes, the best result ever achieved by a woman in a presidential election in Portugal. On 9 September 2021, Marisa Matias announced she would run for president again on the 2021 Portuguese presidential election.

References

External links
 
 
 
 

1976 births
Living people
Candidates for President of Portugal
Left Bloc MEPs
MEPs for Portugal 2009–2014
MEPs for Portugal 2014–2019
MEPs for Portugal 2019–2024
21st-century women MEPs for Portugal
Portuguese sociologists
University of Coimbra alumni